Kenneth M. Quinn (born May 26, 1942) is the former President of the World Food Prize Foundation and a former career U.S. Foreign Service Officer. He was the president of the foundation for 20 years from 1 January 2000 to the 3 January 2020. Before assuming that role, Quinn spent 32 years working for the U.S. State Department. He has served as the United States Ambassador to Cambodia, Deputy Assistant Secretary of State as well as a member of the National Security Council staff at the White House.

Biography
Quinn was born in New York City in 1942, and he attended high school in Dubuque, Iowa. Quinn received his undergraduate degree from Loras College in Dubuque, Iowa. He went on to earn graduate degrees in international relations from Marquette University in Milwaukee, Wisconsin and the University of Maryland. He and his wife, Le Son, have three children.

Diplomatic career
Quinn was a 32-year career member of the U.S. Senior Foreign Service before he retired and joined the World Food Prize Foundation. He entered the United States Foreign Service in 1968 and has served in various Southeast Asian countries as well as Vienna and Washington, DC. Quinn is fluent in Vietnamese and acted as interpreter for President Gerald Ford.

Awards
Quinn has received a number of awards, including the State Department's Award for Heroism and Valor for his work in Cambodia and Vietnam. For his combat operations participation in Vietnam, Quinn received the U.S. Army Air Medal, and he remains the only civilian ever to win this honor. He also is a three-time recipient of the American Foreign Service Association's Rivkin and Herter Awards for courage in challenging policy.

Quinn is also a member of the Chicago Council on Global Affairs.

References

External links
Biography at the World Food Prize Foundation website

1942 births
Living people
People from Dubuque, Iowa
People from New York City
Ambassadors of the United States to Cambodia
Loras College alumni
Marquette University alumni
University of Maryland, College Park alumni
United States Foreign Service personnel